Yasuko Muramatsu (Japanese: 村松泰子, born 1944) is a Japanese development economist, author and women's rights activist.

She was the president of Tokyo Gakugei University and is the president of Japan Women's Learning Foundation.

Early life and education 
Muramatsu was born in 1944. She graduated from the University of Tokyo's Faculty of Letters and has a PhD from the Sophia University Graduate School.

Career 
Muramatsu worked at the NHK Broadcasting Culture Research Institute from 1967 until 1991. She then worked at the Tokyo Woman's Christian University where she studied the economic status of women in Japan and was part of the steering committee on the Center for Women's Studies. She next worked as a professor at Tokyo Gakugei University where she became the president from April 2010 to March 2014. She delivered her final lecture Gender Studies in Media and Education on 27 February 2010.

In 2014, she remained as the president of Japan Women's Learning Foundation.

She is a member of the Japan-based International Group for the Study of Women and chaired the organisation's third International Symposium on Women in an Age of Science and Technology.

Selected publications 

 Gender Construction Through Interactions Between the Media and Audience in Japan, 2013, https://doi.org/10.1111/1475-6781.00018

References 

Living people
1944 births
21st-century Japanese writers
21st-century Japanese women writers
20th-century Japanese writers
20th-century Japanese women writers
Japanese feminists
Japanese academics
Sophia University alumni
University of Tokyo alumni
Academic staff of Tokyo Gakugei University
Japanese activists
Presidents of universities and colleges in Japan